The 1999 Victorian Football League season was the 118th season of the Australian rules football competition.

The premiership was won by the Springvale Football Club, after defeating North Ballarat by 60 points in the Grand Final on 19 September. It was Springvale's fourth premiership in five seasons, and was North Ballarat's first Grand Final appearance.

Premiership season

Ladder

Finals

Grand Final

Awards
The Jim 'Frosty' Miller Medal was won by Nick Sautner (Sandringham), who kicked 82 goals.
The J. J. Liston Trophy was won by John Georgiou (Frankston), who polled 21 votes. Georgiou tied on votes with Mark Brebner (Box Hill), but Brebner was ineligible to share the award, having been twice suspended during the year.
The Fothergill-Round Medal was won by Mark Passador (Springvale).
North Ballarat won the reserves premiership for the second consecutive year. North Ballarat 9.6 (60) defeated Springvale 7.15 (57) in the Grand Final, held as a curtain-raiser to the Seniors Grand Final on 19 September.

Notable events
The Jim 'Frosty' Miller Medal was struck as a new award for the leading goalkicker in the home-and-away season. The award was named after Dandenong full-forward Jim 'Frosty' Miller, who kicked 885 goals in a career spanning 1967–1977.
Cash-strapped Coburg entered a partnership with the Fitzroy Football Club during the season. Fitzroy, which had played in the VFA between 1884 and 1896, then in the VFL/AFL from 1897 until 1996, no longer operated a football team following the creation of the Brisbane Lions in late 1996, but it still had an administrative presence. Under what was effectively a sponsorship arrangement, Coburg became known as the Coburg-Fitzroy Lions, taking its new name at the beginning of August. The club retained navy blue and red as its main colours, but adopted Fitzroy's red, royal blue and gold colours as an alternative strip.

See also
 List of VFA/VFL premiers
 Australian rules football
 Victorian Football League
 Australian Football League

References

Victorian Football League seasons
VFL